is the eighth single by Japanese entertainer Miho Nakayama. Written by Takashi Matsumoto and Kyōhei Tsutsumi, the single was released on November 21, 1986, by King Records. An extended remix of the song, known as the "Party Version", was released as a 12" single on December 10, 1986.

Background and release
"Waku Waku Sasete" was used as the opening theme of the Fuji TV drama series , which starred Nakayama.

Bassist Masato Nakamura was a member of Nakayama's backing band during live performances of the song before he went on to form the band Dreams Come True.

The B-side is "Heart no Switch wo Oshite", which was alternately titled "Switch On" in the album Exotique and the 1991 compilation album Miho's Select.

"Waku Waku Sasete" peaked at No. 3 on Oricon's weekly singles chart and sold over 237,000 copies, making it Nakayama's biggest-selling single until "You're My Only Shinin' Star" in 1988. The "Party Version" single peaked at No. 22 and sold over 2,900 copies.

Track listing
All lyrics are written by Takashi Matsumoto; all music is composed by Kyōhei Tsutsumi; all music is arranged by Motoki Funayama.

Charts
Weekly charts

Year-end charts

Cover versions
 Kaori Momoi covered the song on her 1993 album More Standard.
 Junlie with Kegawazoku covered the song on the 2004 single "Wonderful World Location Roll".
 Kaoru covered the song on the 2006 various artists album Ladies Trance: Aishiteru.
 Chinami Ishizaka covered the song as the B-side of her 2007 single "Play Love ~Harenchina~".
 MAX covered the song on their 2010 cover album Be MAX.
 Janet Kay covered the song in English on her 2012 cover album Idol Kay.
 Houkago Princess covered the song on the 2013 various artists album King of Pops 2: Guitar Man GPK Meigi.

References

External links

1986 singles
1986 songs
Japanese-language songs
Japanese television drama theme songs
Miho Nakayama songs
Songs with lyrics by Takashi Matsumoto (lyricist)
Songs with music by Kyōhei Tsutsumi
King Records (Japan) singles